Peter Daniel may refer to:

Peter Daniel (Australian footballer) (born 1947), Australian rules player and coach
Peter Daniel (footballer, born 1955), English association footballer
Peter Daniel (footballer, born 1946), English association footballer
Peter Vivian Daniel (1784–1860), American jurist
Peter Maxwell Daniel (1910–1998), British medical doctor

See also